Pineville High School was a high school located in Wyoming County, West Virginia. It was closed in 1998 after consolidation with nearby Mullens High School to form Wyoming East High School.

A portion of the students from nearby Glen Rogers High School were consolidated into Pineville High School when that school closed in the 1990s.

Pineville High School's team name was The Minutemen and the school colors were maroon and gold.

Feeder schools for Pineville High School included Pineville Middle School and Glen Rogers Elementary School.

Pineville High School's school colors during the 1950s and 60s were maroon and white.  During those days of heated school rivalries with the Oceana Indians, Mullens Rebels, and Baileysville Rough Riders, the cheer leaders often led the crowd in this cheer:  Maroon and white, fight, fight. We're going to win this game tonight.

Defunct schools in West Virginia
Educational institutions disestablished in 1998
Former school buildings in the United States
Schools in Wyoming County, West Virginia